Rodger Bumpass (born November 20, 1951) is an American actor and comedian. He is known for his long-running role as Squidward Tentacles on the American animated television series SpongeBob SquarePants. He voices several other characters on the show as well, including the purple doctor fish and various anchovies.

He also voiced The Chief in the animated series Where on Earth Is Carmen Sandiego?, Professor Membrane from Invader Zim and Mr. Besser, the school principal in the animated series The Kids from Room 402. Bumpass has many other credits in animated films, animated television series, and video games.

Early life
Rodger Bumpass was born on November 20, 1951, in Jonesboro, Arkansas, to Carroll C. (1924–2009) and Virginia Cathey Bumpass (1921–2004). He had two siblings, one of whom died early. He attended Little Rock Central High School, where he received his first training in theater. He then majored in radio–TV and minored in theater at Arkansas State University. He worked at the campus radio station and also at Jonesboro's Gray Television owned ABC/NBC/CW+ affiliated television station, KAIT-TV, where he had multiple duties as announcer, film processor, cameraman, audio technician, and technical director.

While at KAIT, he also wrote, produced, and performed in a late-night comedy program called Mid-Century Nonsense Festival Featuring Kumquat Theater.  He graduated from A-State in 1976, and when encouraged by an A-State professor to consider professional theater, he moved to New York in June 1977.

Career

In 1977, he won a role in the National Lampoon's music and comedy road show That's Not Funny, That's Sick and toured with them until 1978.  That same year, he appeared in the TV special Disco Beaver from Outer Space for HBO. In 1979, Bumpass was cast as the leading role in a National Lampoon film to be called Jaws 3, People 0 in which he would have a love scene with Bo Derek. However, the film was canceled due to objections by the creators of the movie Jaws. In 1980, Bumpass created the character of 'Fartman' to appear on the National Lampoon LP The White Album, which later inspired the Howard Stern character by the same name.

Bumpass is best known to present-day viewers as the voice of Squidward Tentacles and various incidental characters on the Nickelodeon animated comedy series SpongeBob SquarePants. In 2012, Bumpass received a Daytime Emmy Award nomination for his role as Squidward. He is also known for voicing The Chief from Where on Earth Is Carmen Sandiego?, Dr. Light on Teen Titans, and Professor Membrane on Invader Zim. Bumpass has been voicing and acting in films since the 60s and has also appeared on stage through the mid 70s until the late 80s.

Personal life
On July 27, 2019, Bumpass married Angela VanZandt, with whom he attended high school fifty years prior.

Legal issues
On January 15, 2016, Bumpass was arrested for alleged DUI in Burbank, California. A police report of the incident alleged that officers of the Burbank Police Department found Bumpass in his blue car in the middle of the road. He was said to have leaned against the car, and when officers walked up to Bumpass for questioning, he tried to walk away and lost his balance, nearly falling to the ground. He confessed to driving after drinking at a Burbank bar before cops spotted him, and he was soon handcuffed after failing a sobriety test. His blood alcohol levels were said to be more than twice the legal limit. He was later released on a $15,000 bail shortly the next morning.<ref>{{Cite web|url=https://www.latimes.com/local/lanow/la-me-ln-spongebob-squarepants-actor-arrested-in-dui-20160120-story.html|title='SpongeBob SquarePants voice of Squidward held on suspicion of DUI|date=January 20, 2016|website=Los Angeles Times}}</ref>

The incident was first reported by celebrity gossip website TMZ several days after it occurred, on January 19. A day later, Bumpass alleged to the website that the police had lied about the DUI report, claiming that he was not leaning against his car when officers spotted him, and that he was being tailed and pulled over by the officers before his arrest, though he did confess again to the DUI charge. Nickelodeon representatives were notified of the incident by Bumpass, but did not release any immediate comments or actions regarding the matter.

On January 25, 2016, ten days after the incident, Nickelodeon representatives confirmed to TMZ that Bumpass would remain on SpongeBob SquarePants'' for the foreseeable future. The representatives alleged that the network's morals clause for the show did not consider DUI charges to be an immoral act, and thus Bumpass was not legally subject to termination.

Filmography

Live action roles

Film

Television

Voice over roles

Film

Television

Video games

Awards and nominations
 2012 – Daytime Emmy Award for Outstanding Performer in an Animated Program – Nominated

References

External links

 

1951 births
Living people
American male film actors
American male television actors
American male video game actors
American male voice actors
Arkansas State University alumni
Little Rock Central High School alumni
Male actors from Arkansas
People from Arkansas
People from Craighead County, Arkansas
People from Jonesboro, Arkansas